Darbarud (also Romanized as Dārbārūd) is a village in Torkaman Rural District, in the Central District of Urmia County, West Azerbaijan Province, Iran. At the 2006 census, its population was 476, in 126 families.

References 

Populated places in Urmia County